A slog is a type of shot in the game cricket.

Slog may also be:
 Super-logarithm, the inverse function of super-exponentiation
 Seattle The Stranger blog
 Slog, a character in Secret Mountain Fort Awesome